The Academy of Cinematographic Arts and Sciences of Spain is a professional organisation dedicated to the promotion and development of Spanish cinema. Founded in 1986, it is responsible for the annual Goya Awards, Spain's principal film awards. It is headquartered in Madrid.

It is a founding member of the Film Academy Network Europe (FAN) and the Ibero-American Federation of Academies of Cinematographic Arts and Sciences (FIACINE).

History
The seed of the academy lies in a meeting of film industry professionals convened by producer  at Madrid's O'Pazo Restaurant on 12 November 1985. A list of attendees to the meeting is listed as follows:

 Luis García Berlanga, director
 Carlos Saura, director
 , unit production manager
 , unit production manager
 José Sacristán, actor
 Charo López, actress
 , film editor
 , film editor
 , screenwriter
 José Nieto, musician
 Carlos Suárez, cinematographer
 , set designer

The academy was duly founded on 8 January 1986. The 1st Goya Awards were presented in March 1987. In 2006, the academy was one of the ten founding members of the Film Academy Network Europe (FAN). In 2007, the academy opened its headquarters (hitherto located in ) in Calle de Zurbano 3, Madrid. In 2017, it was a founding member of Ibero-American Federation of Academies of Cinematographic Arts and Sciences (FIACINE).

Presidents 

 , 1986–1988
 Fernando Trueba, 1988
 Antonio Giménez Rico 1988–1992
 Fernando Rey, 1992–1994
 Gerardo Herrero, 1994
 José Luis Borau, 1994–1998
 Aitana Sánchez-Gijón, 1998–2000
 Marisa Paredes, 2000–2003
 Mercedes Sampietro, 2003–2006
 Ángeles González Sinde, 2006–2009
 Eduardo Campoy, 2009
 Álex de la Iglesia, 2009–2011
 , 2011–2015
 Antonio Resines, 2015–2016
 Yvonne Blake, 2016–2018
 Mariano Barroso, 2018–2022
 , since 2022

References

External links
  Official website of the AACCE

Organizations established in 1986
Film organisations in Spain
1986 establishments in Spain
Organisations based in Madrid